Krabat is a 1971  fantasy novel about the eponymous Sorbian folk hero, written by Otfried Preußler. The book deals primarily with black magic and the lure of evil. Other  themes include friendship, love, and death. It won the Deutscher Jugendliteraturpreis (Prize for Literature for Young People) in 1972.

Plot

Set in the beginning of the 18th century during the Great Northern War, the story follows the life of Krabat, a 14-year-old Wendish beggar boy living in the eastern part of Saxony. For three consecutive nights, he is called to a watermill near the village Schwarzkollm through a dream. Upon heeding the call and arriving at the mill, he begins his apprenticeship as a miller's man. He soon joins the secret brotherhood, composed of journeymen and apprentices, and discovers that the skill he is meant to learn through this apprenticeship is black magic. The first magic powers Krabat acquires are rather harmless, such as the ability to turn himself into a raven. Other peculiarities of this watermill include the lack of any outside visitors, including farmers who would have brought grain. The only visitor to the mill is one Goodman, who may be the devil, although this is never made explicit.

The senior journeyman Tonda, Krabat's best friend and older brother figure, dies, ostensibly of an accident, on New Year's Eve in Krabat's first year at the mill. Tonda offers strangely little resistance to his own death. Krabat's suspicions of foul play are further reinforced when another journeyman and friend, Michal, dies the following New Year's Eve. He soon realizes that the master is bound in a pact to the Goodman: the master must sacrifice one journeyman every year on New Year's Eve, or perish himself.

Wishing to take revenge for his friends' death, Krabat secretly trains to increase his magical strength so he can fight the master. His quest is aided by a girl from the nearby village, a church singer, “Kantorka”, whose name is never mentioned (“Kantorka” meaning just ‘girl chorister’). Krabat learns that to end the spell, his lover must challenge the master for him; then whoever loses the challenge, the master or the two lovers, will die. The master offers Krabat another solution: He will retire and let Krabat inherit the mill, along with the pact to the Goodman; but Krabat refuses to perpetuate the evil pact. So the challenge goes ahead, and the girl's task is to distinguish Krabat from the rest of the journeymen, all of them are standing in a row, while she is blindfolded. She manages to pick him out by the fact that he fears mainly for her life, while the others fear mainly for their own. Ultimately, she rescues Krabat from death, and they and the journeymen escape the mill. The master is left to die in the burning mill on New Year's Eve, while the survivors lose all their magic powers and are now simple millers who have to provide for themselves through normal hard work.

Characters 
The characters of this novel provide a stark distinction between good and evil. Krabat, his love interest the Kantorka, Tonda, Juro and Michal stand for the side of the good, whereas the master of the mill, the Goodman and the one journeyman who betrays his brothers stand for the bad. There are, however, a few journeymen who are indifferent or ambiguous to the ongoing struggle, and who neither support nor oppose the master.

Interpretation 
Although the story is quite close to the original Sorbian tale of Krabat that dates back to the 18th century, Preußler himself also considered it to tell the story of himself, his generation, and all young people who encounter power and its temptations and get ensnarled by it.

Publication history
The book was first published in 1971 and in an English translation first as The Satanic Mill from 1972 to 1991, then republished in 2000 as The Curse of the Darkling Mill, in 2011 as Krabat and in 2014 as Krabat and the Sorcerer's Mill.

Adaptations
The story was adapted into a 1977 Czech animated film, Čarodějův učeň (The Sorcerer's Apprentice), directed by Karel Zeman.

The band ASP started with a musical version of the story, in 12 parts, in 2006. In 2008 they finished the project with a 15-track album (on two CDs) called Zaubererbruder (i.e. "Sorcerer-Brother").

Marco Kreuzpaintner's film adaptation of Otfried Preußler's book, also named Krabat, was released in Germany on October 9, 2008.

The 1975 East German television film Die schwarze Mühle is based on a different novelization of the same folk tale by Jurij Brězan. It aired on Fernsehen der DDR starring Polish Actor Leon Niemczyk, dubbed for the GDR tv viewers by Norbert Christian, Monika Woytowicz, Herbert Köfer, Uwe Kockisch, and Ernst-Georg Schwill.

Other books 
Krabat is also the main character of three novels, written by the Sorbian writer Jurij Brězan, published in 1968 (adapted into a film by East German state television in 1975), 1976 and 1993.

See also 
Howl's Moving Castle

References

External links 
 Author's Official Site (English & German)
 Photo album of international book covers

1971 German novels
Works based on folklore
German fantasy novels
German novels adapted into films
Novels about magic
Novels set in Germany
Sorbian culture
Dark fantasy novels